Johannes Leonardus "Jan" Flinterman (2 October 1919 – 26 December 1992) was a Dutch air force pilot during World War II and a racing driver. Together with Dries van der Lof, he was the first driver from the Netherlands to compete in Formula One.

Flinterman participated in one World Championship Grand Prix, the 1952 Dutch Grand Prix on 17 August 1952.  When he had to retire his Maserati with a failure of the rear axle, he was able to take over the similar car of his team mate, Chico Landi. Flinterman finished the race in ninth place, scoring no championship points.

Flinterman died in Leiden in December 1992.

Complete Formula One World Championship results
(key)

* Indicates shared drive with Chico Landi

Military decorations
  Officer of the Order of Orange-Nassau
  Airman's Cross 
  War Commemorative Cross 
  Distinguished Flying Cross
  1939–1945 Star
  France and Germany Star
  Defence Medal
  War Medal 1939–1945

References

1919 births
1992 deaths
Royal Netherlands Air Force pilots
Royal Netherlands Air Force officers
Royal Netherlands Air Force personnel of World War II
Royal Air Force officers
Dutch racing drivers
Dutch Formula One drivers
Officers of the Order of Orange-Nassau
Recipients of the Airman's Cross
Recipients of the Distinguished Flying Cross (United Kingdom)
Sportspeople from The Hague